Santa Caterina is a village in Tuscany, central Italy,  administratively a frazione of the comune of Roccalbegna, province of Grosseto, in the southern area of Mount Amiata. At the time of the 2001 census its population amounted to 110.

Santa Caterina is about 40 km from Grosseto and 3 km from Roccalbegna.

Main sights 
 Santa Caterina, main parish of the village, it was built in the 1960s.
 Santa Caterina delle Ruote, little chapel of 16th century.
 Museum of Focarazza, ethnografic museum about rural life and the traditional fire ritual of Santa Caterina.

References

See also 
 Cana, Tuscany
 Triana, Tuscany
 Vallerona

Frazioni of Roccalbegna